The 93rd Infantry Division was a "colored" segregated unit of the United States Army in World War I and World War II. However, in World War I only its four infantry regiments, two brigade headquarters, and a provisional division headquarters were organized, and the divisional and brigade headquarters were demobilized in May 1918. Its regiments fought primarily under French command in that war. During tough combat in France, they soon acquired from the French the nickname Blue Helmets, as these units were issued horizon blue French Adrian helmets. This referred to the service of several of its units with the French Army during the Second Battle of the Marne. Consequently, its shoulder patch became a blue French helmet, to commemorate its service with the French Army during the German spring offensive.

The division was reactivated with the "colored" infantry designation on 15 May 1942 at Fort Huachuca, Arizona, and shipped overseas in 1944. Most of the division saw service in the Pacific Theater during World War II, but its regiments were mainly used as construction units and in defensive operations. In 1945, the 93rd Infantry Division was inactivated, though the lineage of several of its units are carried on by units in the Illinois and Maryland Army National Guards.

World War I
The 93rd was known initially as the 93rd Division (Provisional). Only the infantry brigades were formed, which fought under French command. The 185th Infantry Brigade was initially commanded by Albert H. Blanding and the 186th by George Herbert Harries. The unit became known as the 93rd Division and was composed of the following regiments:

185th Brigade (Infantry)
 369th Infantry Regiment ("The Harlem Hellfighters"; formerly the 15th Infantry Regiment, New York National Guard). Now the 719th Transportation Company, 369th Sustainment Brigade.
 370th Infantry Regiment ("The Black Devils"; formerly the 8th Infantry Regiment, Illinois National Guard). Awarded the Fourragère. Now lineage is carried on by the 1st Battalion, 178th Infantry, Illinois National Guard.

186th Brigade (Infantry)
 371st Infantry Regiment (1st Provisional Infantry Regiment, National Army was drawn from black draftees)
 372nd Infantry Regiment Made up of troops of the 1st Separate Battalion, District of Columbia National Guard; 1st Separate Company, Connecticut National Guard; Company L, Massachusetts National Guard; 9th Separate Battalion, Ohio National Guard; 1st Separate Company, Maryland National Guard; and 250 draftees from Camp Custer, Michigan. Now its lineage is carried on by the 229th Main Support Battalion, Maryland National Guard, and the 372nd Military Police Battalion, District of Columbia National Guard.

The division was activated in December 1917 and sent to France; however, the troops never fought together as a division, and in fact, the provisional division headquarters was demobilized in May 1918. Over the objections of the division's commander, Brig. Gen. Roy Hoffman (appointed 15 December 1917), its brigades were broken up and the regiments brigaded with French Army formations. They were issued French equipment and arms but wore US uniforms; the "blue hat" nickname is derived from the blue-painted Casque Adrian helmets they wore.

Each regiment was brigaded with French forces for three time periods: 1 to 21 July 1918; from 1 August 1918; and from 24 October 1918 to the armistice:

The regiments that later formed the 93rd were originally sent to France to be converted into badly needed labor units. However, the outcry by African-American leaders including W. E. B. Du Bois and A. Philip Randolph forced the US to reconsider. The alternative would be the potential loss of needed African-American recruits for labor and service units.

Four independent regiments were chosen to assume the designations of the 93rd (Provisional) Infantry Division's regiments (369th, 370th, 371st, and 372nd Infantry). The problem was, where to place them?

The main American Expeditionary Force (AEF) refused to have African-American soldiers in combat. Ironically, the commander of the AEF, General John Joseph "Black Jack" Pershing had earned his nickname and reputation as an officer in the 10th Cavalry Regiment, then still a black Buffalo Soldier regiment. While Pershing was an early supporter of having "colored" soldiers in the military, he seems to have bowed to political expediency in this case.

The British already had several American divisions under their command. This was due to a deal struck with the American armed forces, which had no transport fleet when they entered the war. The United Kingdom and their Commonwealth allies would transport six American divisions by sea to Europe. Then the American divisions would be folded into British Corps. The French had a similar deal where they exchanged the Americans' 3-inch guns for early-model French 75 mm cannon to simplify the supply of ammunition and Chauchat light machineguns to replace the Americans' scarce Lewis Guns. In return, they demanded that American troops be placed under their command to replace their early-war losses.

Combat chronicle
The regiments fought in several battles alongside French troops, who were already used to colonial North and Sub-Saharan African "colored" soldiers (noirs). All regiments acquitted themselves well and received unit citations from the French. Numerous individual soldiers exhibited extraordinary heroism and were highly decorated by the French. One of these was Cpl. Freddie Stowers, who decades after his death would be awarded the American Medal of Honor. The division's shoulder patch, with its blue French Adrian helmet, commemorated this period.

Total casualties from all regiments were 3,167, with 523 killed in action and 2,644 wounded. The 93rd Division had two Medal of Honor recipients—Lt. George S. Robb and Cpl. Freddie Stowers—75 Distinguished Service Crosses and 527 Croix de Guerre medals.

The Red Hand Division

In May 1918, French General Mariano Goybet was ordered to command the French 157th Infantry Division, which had been devastated after the Third Battle of the Aisne. On 4 July 1918, it was reconstituted by putting together the 333rd Infantry Regiment (French) with two of the U.S. 93rd's regiments—the 371st and 372nd.

General Goybet took special notice of the fact this was the first 4 July to be celebrated by his now Franco-American Division.

The rebuilt 157th Division participated in the Second Battle of the Marne. With violent attacks, General Goybet broke the enemy front at Monthois, capturing many prisoners and a considerable amount of materiel in the process. Afterward, he occupied the Vosges, re-capturing Sainte-Marie-aux-Mines.

General Order No. 234 (8 October 1918):

World War II

Activated: 15 May 1942. 368th, 369th & 25th Inf Regts
Trained at Camp Coxcomb and Camp Essex in California 1943.
Overseas: 24 January 1944.
Campaigns: New Guinea, Northern Solomons (Bougainville), Bismarck Archipelago (Admiralty Islands)
Awards: DSC: 1; DSM: 1; SS: 5; LM: 5; SM: 16; BSM: 686; AM: 27.
Commanders: Maj. Gen. Charles P. Hall (May–October 1942), Maj. Gen. Fred W. Miller(October 1942 – May 1943), Maj. Gen. Raymond G. Lehman (May 1943 – August 1944), Maj. Gen. Harry H. Johnson (August 1944 – September 1945), Brig. Gen. Leonard R. Boyd (September 1945 to inactivation).
Returned to United States: 1 February 1946.
Inactivated: 3 February 1946.

Commanders
In August 1944, Major General Harry H. Johnson, the former commander of the 2nd Cavalry Division, assumed command of the Division, relieving Major General Lehman, who had returned to the United States for medical reasons. He would lead the division through the remainder of the war, including the New Guinea-Philippines campaign.

Combat chronicle
An advance party of the 93rd Infantry Division arrived at Guadalcanal on 29 January 1944. The rest of the division landed between 6 February and 5 March, one regiment disembarking at the Russell Islands on 7 February. The bulk of the division engaged in training, labor and security duties on Guadalcanal and the Treasury Islands from 7 June and both Hollandia Dutch New Guinea from 30 October. Component units performed similar duties on Finschhafen from 12 October 1944 to 31 March 1945, on Los Negros from 29 September 1944 to 16 March 1945, and on Biak from 10 October 1944 to 1 October 1945. The division's combat elements moved to Bougainville Island on 28 March 1944, and were attached to the Americal Division on the 30th. On that date they entered combat, assisting in attacks on the enemy perimeter. These elements, including the 25th RCT, reconnoitered across the Laruma River on 2 April, and in the Torokina River Valley from 7–12 April 1944. The 25th RCT operated against the Japanese along the Kuma and East-West Trails during May 1944. The combat team left for the Green Islands during May and June. The 93d Rcn. Troop, attached to the XIV Corps, remained to raid, patrol, and maintain perimeter positions. The troop began training 12 September 1944, and moved to Finschhafen on 1 November. Security patrols had scattered contacts with the enemy at Urapas from 3 to 15 January 1945, at Wardo on Biak from 6 November-22 December, and at Wari on Biak on 31 December. The security detachments at Wardo and Wari were withdrawn on 9–10 February 1945.

Almost all of the Division occupied Morotai, Dutch New Guinea, from 4 April to 21 October 1945. Scattered skirmishes occurred along the northwestern sector of the island. The 93rd continued its labor and security missions. It occupied Sansapor from 5 April to 10 July 1945, Middleburg Island from 5 April to 7 October 1945, and Noemfoor Island from 13 April to 7 June 1945. The Division then moved to Zamboanga, Philippine Islands, where it remained from 1 July 1945 to 7 January 1946. Patrols encountered light resistance until the end of hostilities, 15 August 1945. Palawan was occupied from 2 July to 5 December 1945, Jolo from 1 July to 2 October 1945, and Sanga-Sanga from 3 July 1945 to 6 January 1946. The Division arrived at Mindanao on 9 October 1945, moved to Tacloban, Leyte on 13 January 1946, and left for home on 17 January 1946.

Leonard E. Dowden
While on Jolo on 17 July 1945, a patrol from the 368th was ambushed by a Japanese force three times its size. When the firefight began, Staff Sergeant Leonard E. Dowden moved his squad to within 30 yards of the enemy. He then crawled forward alone to assault a machine-gun position with grenades, despite being gravely wounded. He would be killed by a burst of fire as he was about to throw a grenade. The patrol was able to fight off the enemy attack with only 18 casualties. For the extraordinary heroism that cost him his life, Staff Sergeant Dowden received the Distinguished Service Cross. Originally from New Orleans, Louisiana, Staff Sergeant Dowden was the only member of the 93rd Infantry Division to earn the DSC during the war.

Morotai

For the remainder of the war, the division would find itself fighting on Morotai. In April 1945, the division conducted intensive patrols with the aim of destroying the remaining Japanese forces on the island. At this time most of the Japanese on Morotai were located along the island's west coast, and generally stayed close to native gardens. The 93rd Division landed patrols along Morotai's west and north coasts from late April onwards, and these fought scattered skirmishes with small Japanese forces. One of the division's main goals was to capture Colonel Ouchi, commander of the 211th Regiment, 32nd Division, and this was achieved by a patrol from the 25th Infantry Regiment on 2 August 1945. Ouchi was the highest ranking Japanese officer to be captured before the end of the war.

End of the war
After the Japanese capitulation in August 1945, the division secured the surrender of 41,000 Japanese troops and civilians on Morotai and the nearby Halmahera islands of the Dutch East Indies. Included were 37,000 troops, of whom 5,000 were in a naval force and 4,000 were civilians. The surrender was accepted on Morotai by Major General Johnson. Lt. General Ishii, the commander of the IJA 32nd Division and the senior surviving officer in the area, surrendered the Japanese Army forces to the 93rd after he was brought to Morotai on a U.S. Navy PT boat.

After the signing Ishii asked Maj. General Johnson if he and his officers would be allowed to retain their samurai swords. Johnson refused and afterwards commented: "Never again will the Japanese have the means, the Army or the inclination to be an aggressor nation. We cannot allow these people to keep any semblance of military might."

Casualties
Total battle casualties: 133
Killed in action: 12
Wounded in action: 121

Order of battle

 Headquarters, 93rd Infantry Division
25th Infantry Regiment
368th Infantry Regiment
369th Infantry Regiment
 Headquarters and Headquarters Battery, 93rd Infantry Division Artillery
 593rd Field Artillery Battalion
 594th Field Artillery Battalion
 595th Field Artillery Battalion
 596th Field Artillery Battalion
 318th Engineer Combat Battalion
 318th Medical Battalion
 93rd Cavalry Reconnaissance Troop (Mechanized)
 Headquarters, Special Troops, 93rd Infantry Division 
 Headquarters Company, 93rd Infantry Division
 793rd Ordnance Light Maintenance Company
 93rd Quartermaster Company 
 93rd Signal Company
 Military Police Platoon
 Band
 93rd Counterintelligence Corps Detachment

General
Shoulder patch: Black circle containing blue Adrian helmet.

See also
 Military history of African Americans

Notes

References
 
 
 
 
The Army Almanac: A Book of Facts Concerning the Army of the United States U.S. Government Printing Office, 1950 reproduced at http://www.history.army.mil/html/forcestruc/cbtchron/cbtchron.html.

Further reading 
 Roberts, Frank E. The American Foreign Legion: Black Soldiers of the 93d in World War I. Annapolis, Maryland: Naval Institute Press, 2004. . .

External links
WWI: Detached Service By Segregated Units
371st Regiment Monument
Fighting for Hope: African American Troops of the 93rd Infantry Division in World War II and Postwar America
The 93rd Division in The Stars and Stripes

093
093
Infantry Division, U.S. 093
093
093
Infantry divisions of the United States Army in World War II
African Americans in World War I
African Americans in World War II
African-American United States Army personnel